Jonathan Robert McHenry (19 October 1919 – 21 January 2003) was an Australian rules footballer who played with Fitzroy and Geelong in the Victorian Football League (VFL).

Notes

External links 

1919 births
2003 deaths
Australian rules footballers from Victoria (Australia)
Fitzroy Football Club players
Geelong Football Club players